Herbert Wesley Farmer Homer (6 October 1895 – 10 February 1977) was an English cricketer and cricket administrator. Homer was a right-handed batsman. He was born at Dudley, Worcestershire.

Homer made his debut for Staffordshire in the 1939 Minor Counties Championship against the Surrey Second XI. He played Minor counties cricket for Staffordshire from 1922 to 1935, making 85 appearances. In 1928, he made his first-class debut for a combined Minor Counties team against the touring West Indians at the County Ground, Exeter in 1928. He made three further first-class appearances for the Minor Counties, against Lancashire in 1929, Wales in 1930 and the touring New Zealanders in 1931. In these four first-class matches he scored a total of 185 runs at an average of 30.83, with a high score of 71. This score came against the New Zealanders.

Later in his life he became the President of the Birmingham and District Cricket League, holding the position in 1950 and again in 1959. He died at Old Hill, Staffordshire on 10 February 1977. His nephew Charles Palmer played Test cricket for England.

References

External links
 Herbert Homer at ESPNcricinfo
 Herbert Homer at CricketArchive

1895 births
1977 deaths
Sportspeople from Dudley
English cricketers
Staffordshire cricketers
Minor Counties cricketers
English cricket administrators